Skye Celine Baker is a Guamanian beauty pageant titleholder who was crowned as Miss Earth Guam 2015 that makes her the representative of Guam at Miss Earth 2015. She won alongside Erin Marie Wong who is Guam's representative for Miss Earth 2014. They were crowned by Katarina Martinez, Miss Earth Guam 2013 and Catharina Choi, Miss Earth - Fire 2013. Jamie Herrell, Miss Philippines Earth 2014, was also there in the event.

Pageantry

Miss Earth Guam 2014
Although the pageant's coronation started an hour late, the jolt of the earthquake only a few hours earlier did not dampen the spirit of the Miss Earth executive committee members led by the upbeat mood of Frank Santos, its president and national director who paraded in his black tuxedo highlighted by a polka dot bow tie.

From 10 semifinalists, five candidates were chosen to answer one question: "What will their first post be about if they will be given responsibility to create a Facebook account for Mother Earth?"

At the end, Miss Fire Guam 2014 is Nicole Marie Pierce; Miss Water Guam 2014 is Tamarie Cabrera Fegurgur and Miss Air Guam 2014 is Maurine Malig Santos.

Miss Earth 2015
As part of her responsibilities, Skye competed at Miss Earth 2015 and placed Top 16.

References

External links
Miss Earth official website

1997 births
Living people
Guamanian beauty pageant winners
Miss Earth 2015 contestants
People from Barrigada